Cyrtodactylus semiadii is a species of gecko, a lizard in the family Gekkonidae. The species is endemic to Java.

Etymology
The specific name, semiadii, is in honor of Indonesian mammalogist Gono Semiadi.

Geographic range
C. semiadii is found in the eastern part of the island of Java, in the province of East Java.

Description

Reproduction
The mode of reproduction of C. semiadii is unknown.

References

Cyrtodactylus
Reptiles described in 2014